Samuelsonia is a genus of leaf beetles in the subfamily Eumolpinae. It is known from the South Province and Mont Panié of New Caledonia, and is named after Dr. G. Allan Samuelson of the Bishop Museum. The genus was established based on general proportions and body size, and may be polyphyletic or paraphyletic.

Species

 Samuelsonia bicolor Jolivet, Verma & Mille, 2007
 Samuelsonia dunali (Montrouzier, 1861)
 Samuelsonia fauveli Jolivet, Verma & Mille, 2007
 Samuelsonia fusca Jolivet, Verma & Mille, 2007 
 Samuelsonia gomeyi Jolivet, Verma & Mille, 2013
 Samuelsonia histrio (Perroud & Montrouzier, 1864)
 Samuelsonia lemerrei Jolivet, Verma & Mille, 2013
 Samuelsonia mayonae Jolivet, Verma & Mille, 2010
 Samuelsonia melas Jolivet, Verma & Mille, 2007
 Samuelsonia minima Jolivet, Verma & Mille, 2013
 Samuelsonia nitida Jolivet, Verma & Mille, 2013
 Samuelsonia panieensis Jolivet, Verma & Mille, 2011
 Samuelsonia pardalis Jolivet, Verma & Mille, 2007
 Samuelsonia pilosa Jolivet, Verma & Mille, 2007
 Samuelsonia pygmaea Jolivet, Verma & Mille, 2010
 Samuelsonia rubiacearum (Perroud & Montrouzier, 1864)
 Samuelsonia rugosa Jolivet, Verma & Mille, 2013
 Samuelsonia turgida Jolivet, Verma & Mille, 2007
 Samuelsonia viridiscens Jolivet, Verma & Mille, 2013

References

Eumolpinae
Chrysomelidae genera
Insects of New Caledonia
Beetles of Oceania
Endemic fauna of New Caledonia